Acacia sparsiflora, also known as currawong or currawang, is a tree belonging to the genus Acacia and the subgenus Juliflorae that is native to a large area in eastern Australia.

Description
It has brown to grey and sometimes reddish coloured bark that has a rough texture and is hard and corrugated or fissured. The glabrous branchlets are angled at the extremities. Like most species of Acacia it has phyllodes rather than true leaves. The grey-green glabrous phyllodes are sickle shaped and narrowed at both ends. It flowers between May and August producing inflorescences that occur in pairs with cylindrical flower-spikes that have a length of  containing bright lemon coloured yellow. The seed pods that form after flowering are brown with yellow margins and are shallowly constricted between the seeds.

Distribution
It is endemic to parts of Queensland and New South Wales and is fairly widespread throughout the Darling Downs region. The tree will often forms dense stands and is sometimes associated with Acacia shirleyi and also as a part of open forests and Eucalyptus woodlands growing in shallow stony soils usually over a bed of weathered sandstone.

See also
List of Acacia species

References

sparsiflora
Flora of Queensland
Flora of New South Wales
Taxa named by Joseph Maiden
Plants described in 1920